Elections to Knowsley Metropolitan Borough Council were held on 1 May 2008. One third of the council was up for election and the Labour Party stayed in overall control of the council.

Prior to the election, the composition of the council is:
Labour 50
Liberal Democrat 13

Candidates

Shevington Ward

Park Ward

Northwood Ward

Whitefiled Ward

Cherryfield Ward

Kirkby Central Ward

Prescot West Ward

Prescot East Ward

Stockbridge Ward

Longview Ward

Page Moss Ward

St Michaels Ward

St Bartholomews Ward

Swanside Ward

Roby Ward

St Gabriels Ward

Halewood North Ward

Halewood West Ward

Halewood South Ward

Whiston North Ward

Whiston South Ward

External links
Knowsley borough elections 2008

2008
2008 English local elections
2000s in Merseyside